Cynthia Lai (October 19, 1954 – October 21, 2022) was a Canadian politician who represented Ward 23 Scarborough North on the Toronto City Council from 2018 to 2022.

Background 
Lai immigrated from Hong Kong and moved to Canada in 1972. Her cousin is Tony Wong, is a former member of Provincial Parliament (MPP) and municipal councillor.

Prior to entering politics, Lai worked as a realtor and was president of the Toronto Real Estate Board, the first Chinese-Canadian woman to hold that position.

Political career 
Lai was elected to the Toronto City Council in the 2018 municipal election to represent Scarborough North (Ward 23). She served on the council until her death in 2022.

Personal life and death
Lai was hospitalized on October 20 during the 2022 election campaign. She died on October 21, 2022, two days after her 68th birthday and just three days before the municipal election. She had been suffering from gallbladder cancer. She was interred at York Cemetery in Toronto.

Flags at Toronto City Hall, Metro Hall and Toronto civic centres were flown at half-mast, and the Toronto Sign was dimmed in her honour.

Electoral history

2018

Ward 23 Scarborough North

References

1954 births
2022 deaths
Canadian politicians of Chinese descent
Canadian real estate businesspeople
Hong Kong emigrants to Canada
Businesspeople from Toronto
Toronto city councillors
Women in Ontario politics
Women municipal councillors in Canada
Deaths from gallbladder cancer
Deaths from cancer in Ontario